Khom Pich (also Romanized as Khom Pīch and Khompīch; also known as Kham-o-Pīch, Kham va Pīch, and Khumpīch) is a village in Kuhsar Rural District, in the Central District of Khansar County, Isfahan Province, Iran. At the 2006 census, its population was 1,378, in 413 families.

References 

Populated places in Khansar County